The Hațeg Country Dinosaurs Geopark has been established in 2004–05 in the general area of the prehistoric Hațeg Island, a large offshore island in the Tethys Sea which existed during the late Cretaceous period, probably from the Cenomanian to the Maastrichtian ages.

Description 
The park is part of the European Geoparks Network and it aims to promote the local values, to ensure the restoration of the monuments, to identify and document the local traditions and to educate and inform the local communities on how to preserve the local cultural identity.

The Hațeg Country is a territory that hosts probably the richest cultural patrimony of Romania. Here are found some of the oldest churches from north of Danube, the largest concentration of medieval sites and monuments in Romania and a big number of architectural monuments, all included in the National Patrimony.

The communities from the region are keepers of important local traditions enriched with elements of the foreign cultures that have interacted with the region throughout its history.

See also
 Hațeg Island
 European Geoparks Network

References

External links
 
 Hateg Country Dinosaurs Geopark – ROMANIA
 Park history

Geography of Hunedoara County
Protected areas of Romania